Sedat Ergin (born in Istanbul in 1957) is a leading Turkish journalist.

After graduating from Robert College High School in Istanbul and receiving a B.A. degree in international relations from Faculty of Political Sciences of Ankara University, Ergin has been active in journalism since 1975 when he began to work for Turkish News Agency as a general assignment reporter. He served as diplomatic reporter at daily Cumhuriyet’s Ankara office from 1979 to 1987.

In 1987, he joined Hürriyet and was assigned to Washington D.C. where he was stationed for almost six years. He was appointed Ankara Bureau Chief for Hürriyet in 1993. He served in this capacity for twelve years during which he focused on internal and external Turkish developments.

In March 2005, he was appointed as the editor-in-chief of Milliyet. He held this position until October 2009 when he returned to Hürriyet as a senior columnist.

In August 2014 he was appointed as the editor-in-chief of Hürriyet. He left this position in March 2017 and returned to writing his regular column.

He was a regular political commentator on NTV and CNN-Turk news channels for many years.

Ergin was awarded the prestigious Sedat Simavi Journalism Prize twice (1997 and 2003), as well as the press freedom awards of the Turkish Journalists' Association (2010) and Deutsche Welle (2016).

References 

Turkish journalists
1957 births
Living people